Caitlin Cole McGee (born January 9, 1988) is an American actress. She is best known for her role as attorney Sydney Strait on the legal drama Bluff City Law. She is currently a regular on the ABC comedy Home Economics.

Career 
McGee has appeared in minor roles on shows such as Blue Bloods, Chicago Med, Grey's Anatomy, and The Marvelous Mrs. Maisel.

McGee was cast in the NBC legal drama Bluff City Law in 2019 as Sydney Strait, the daughter of an accomplished litigator and an accomplished corporate attorney herself. She was named the grand marshal of the AAA Texas 500 in 2019 as a part of a promotion for Bluff City Law.

In October 2019, McGee played Emma, the love interest of Dev Patel’s Joshua, in the Season One episode of Amazon Prime Video’s anthology series Modern Love titled “When Cupid is a Prying Journalist.”

In July 2020, McGee was cast in the pilot of Home Economics as Sarah.

Personal life 
McGee grew up in Newton, Massachusetts, where she attended Newton North High School, graduating in 2006. She is a graduate of Wagner College with a Bachelor's degree in Theatre Performance and Speech. 

McGee started dating actor Patrick Woodall in 2014, and got married in 2021. Their first child, a daughter, was born on September 27, 2022.

Filmography

Film

Television

References

External links 
 Official website
 
 
 

1988 births
Living people
Actresses from Boston
Wagner College alumni
21st-century American actresses
American television actresses